The Manrak Formation (Russian: Manrakskaya Svita) is a Campanian geologic formation in Kazakhstan. Fossil dinosaur eggs have been reported from the formation.

See also 
 List of dinosaur-bearing rock formations
 List of stratigraphic units with dinosaur trace fossils
 Dinosaur eggs

References

Bibliography 
  

Geologic formations of Kazakhstan
Upper Cretaceous Series of Asia
Cretaceous Kazakhstan
Campanian Stage
Sandstone formations
Shale formations
Ooliferous formations
Paleontology in Kazakhstan